Faridah Àbíké-Íyímídé (born 13 October 1999) is a British and Nigerian novelist, short-story writer and columnist. Her debut novel, the young adult thriller Ace of Spades (2021), received the NAACP Image Award for Outstanding Literary Work – Youth/Teens in 2022, and reached the top ten on The New York Times Best Seller list. 

Additionally, Àbíké-Íyímídé has contributed writings to several publications, including The Bookseller, gal-dem, NME and Reader's Digest.

Early life and education
Àbíké-Íyímídé was born and raised in Croydon in South London. She lived in Aberdeen, Scotland while studying English, Chinese and anthropology at the University of Aberdeen. She currently lives in London.

Career
Àbíké-Íyímídé's debut novel, Ace of Spades, is a young adult thriller with themes of "homophobia in the black community, institutional racism and the diversity of thought among black people". In 2018 she gained an agent and a UK book deal for Ace of Spades with Usborne Publishing. In 2020 she gained a US book deal with Macmillan Publishers for Ace of Spades along with a second novel, for a seven-figure sum.

Bibliography
Ace of Spades. New York: Feiwel & Friends, 2021. . London: Usborne, 2021. .

References

External links 
 

Muslim writers
21st-century English women writers
21st-century British novelists
21st-century Nigerian novelists
British women novelists
Living people
British people of Nigerian descent
British writers of young adult literature
Nigerian fantasy writers
British fantasy writers
Women science fiction and fantasy writers
Black speculative fiction authors
Nigerian women writers
Writers from London
Alumni of the University of Aberdeen
1999 births